Akantaş is a village in the Murgul District, Artvin Province, Turkey. Its population is 153 (2021).

References

Villages in Murgul District